Bishop John Gallagher (1846–1923) was an Irish born priest who served as the Roman Catholic Bishop of Goulburn, Australia.
Born in Castlederg, Ireland, in 1846, he was ordained in 1869 for the diocese of Goulburn by the Archbishop of Sydney Cardinal Moran. He served as a priest in Goulburn, Dr Gallagher a noted classicist, taught at St Patrick's College, Goulburn, where he served as  president of the college from 1875 until 1888.
Dr Gallagher was appointed Titular Bishop of Adrassus, co-adjutor Bishop of Goulburn
and in 1900 Bishop of Goulburn.
In 1916 he laid the foundation stone of Sacred Heart Church, Cootamundra.

"John O'Brien"'s 1921 comic poem, 'Tangmalangaloo', in which a bishop visiting a remote bush school asks a boy what Christmas is and receives the reply "It's the day before the races out at Tangmalangaloo" is a true story of a visit by Gallagher to Tangmangaroo.

Rt. Rev. Dr. John Gallagher died aged 77 in 1923.

References

1846 births
1923 deaths
19th-century Irish Roman Catholic priests
20th-century Roman Catholic bishops in Australia
Roman Catholic bishops of Goulburn